Tin Shui Wai Sports Ground is a multi-use sports ground at 2 Tin Shui Road, Tin Shui Wai, Yuen Long, Hong Kong. It has a grass football field and a 400m running track.

It will be used by TSW Pegasus as its main training ground during the 2008-09 Hong Kong First Division League season.

History
Tin Shui Wai Sports Ground was commissioned on 1 April 1994. An opening ceremony was held by Cheung Yan-lung, chairman of the Regional Council, on 24 September 1994. It has been under the management of the Leisure and Cultural Services Department since the Provisional Regional Council was disbanded at the end of the millennium.

References

Tin Shui Wai
Sports venues in Hong Kong
Football venues in Hong Kong